Derostichus is a genus of beetles in the family Carabidae, containing the following species:

 Derostichus caucasicus Motschulsky, 1859
 Derostichus meurguesae Ledoux, 1972

References

Licininae